Heichal HaTarbut, officially the Charles Bronfman Auditorium, until 2013 the Fredric R. Mann Auditorium, is the largest concert hall in Tel Aviv, Israel, and home to the Israel Philharmonic Orchestra.

History

Heichal HaTarbut, originally named the Mann Auditorium, opened in 1957 at Habima Square. The building was designed by Dov Karmi, Zeev Rechter and Yaakov Rechter. Leonard Bernstein conducted the inaugural concert, with the Israel Philharmonic and pianist Arthur Rubinstein as a soloist.

Until 2013, the hall was officially known as the Fredric R. Mann Auditorium, bearing the name of its donor. Renovations under the supervision of Israeli architect Ofer Kolker were undertaken from 2011 to 2013. The new acoustics were designed by Japanese Yasuhisa Toyota.

Heichal HaTarbut reopened in May 2013 with a performance of Gustav Mahler's 5th Symphony by the Israel Philharmonic Orchestra under its music director Zubin Mehta.

The hall is now called Charles Bronfman Auditorium, after Canadian-American businessman and philanthropist Charles Bronfman.

See also
List of concert halls
Music in Israel
Culture in Israel
Architecture of Israel

References

External links

MSS 154, Fredric R. Mann Papers in the Irving S. Gilmore Music Library of Yale University. 

Music venues completed in 1957
Buildings and structures in Tel Aviv
Concert halls in Israel
Tourist attractions in Tel Aviv
Culture in Tel Aviv
1957 establishments in Israel
Yaakov Rechter buildings